Júlia Székely (Budapest, 8 May 1906 – 19 March 1986) was a Hungarian writer and musician.

She studied with the composer Béla Bartók, eventually becoming a pianist. She is also the author of biographies (especially of famous musicians), novels and dramas.

Works 

 A repülő egér (1939): novel
 A halhatatlan kedves (1961): biography of composer Ludwig van Beethoven
 Vándor Évek (1962): biography of composer Franz Liszt
 Elindultam szép hazámból (1965) : biography of Béla Bartók
 Schubertiáda (1968) : biography of composer Franz Schubert
 Chopin Párizsban (1969) : biography of composer Frédéric Chopin

Sources 

 Biographical note on the electronic Lexikon website: https://web.archive.org/web/20111005204636/http://www.netlexikon.hu/yrk/Ryrgenwm/14441 (hu)

1906 births
1986 deaths
Musicians from Budapest
Hungarian classical pianists
Hungarian women pianists
Hungarian musicians
20th-century classical pianists
Pupils of Béla Bartók
Women biographers
20th-century biographers
Hungarian women novelists
20th-century Hungarian novelists
20th-century Hungarian women writers
20th-century women composers
20th-century women pianists